MECD may refer to:

Ministry of Education, Culture and Sport (MECD) Spain
Ministerio de Educación, Cultura y Deportes (MECD) Government of Nicaragua
Manchester Engineering Campus Development (MECD) School of Materials, University of Manchester
Meesmann corneal dystrophy (MECD) 
MECD - Microsoft Encarta College Dictionary
MECD (album), 2004 Norwegian experimental album by Kaada